Bruno Köbele (born 10 August 1934) is a former German trade unionist.

Born in Freiburg im Breisgau, Köbele worked as a bricklayer.  He joined the Building and Construction Union (IG BSE) in 1950, and joined the Social Democratic Party of Germany in 1957.  He was elected to the executive committee of IG BSE in 1969, in which role he became known for his focus on improving vocational training.

In 1982, Köbele was elected as vice president of the union, and he also became involved in international trade unionism.  In 1985, he was elected as president of the European Federation of Woodworkers.  He was elected as president of IG BSE in 1991, and as president of the International Federation of Building and Wood Workers (IFBWW) in 1993.

Köbele retired from the IG BSE in 1995, and from the IFBWW in 1997.  He became active in the Internationaler Bund, and serving as its president from 2003 until 2013.  He holds the First Class Federal Cross of Merit.

References

1934 births
Living people
German trade unionists
Commanders Crosses of the Order of Merit of the Federal Republic of Germany
People from Freiburg im Breisgau